Box Bar Stadium is a multi-use stadium in Banjul, the Gambia.  It is currently used mostly for football matches and was the home stadium for the Gambia national football team until Independence Stadium opened.  It was also the home of the Gambian Cup.

External links
Jojo Cobbinah: Senegal / Gambia.. Meyer Travel Guide, 2002, 
Ilona Hupe: Gambia. Kleines Urlaubsparadies in Westafrika.., 1999, 
Rosel Jahn: Gambia : Reiseführer mit Landeskunde ; mit einem Reiseatlas. May, Dreieich 1997,

References

Football venues in the Gambia
Multi-purpose stadiums in the Gambia